The indusium griseum, (supracallosal gyrus, gyrus epicallosus) consists of a thin membranous layer of grey matter in contact with the upper surface of the corpus callosum and continuous laterally with the grey matter of the cingulate cortex and inferiorly with the hippocampus. It is vestigial in humans and is a remnant of the former position of the hippocampus in lower animals.

On either side of the midline of the indusium griseum are two ridges formed by bands of longitudinally directed fibers known as the medial and lateral longitudinal striae.

The indusium griseum is prolonged around the splenium of the corpus callosum as a delicate layer, the fasciolar gyrus, which is continuous below with the surface of the dentate gyrus. Toward the genu of the corpus callosum it curves down along  the rostrum to form the subcallosal gyrus.

References

External links
 

Gyri